Lee Derek Tucker (born 14 September 1971) is an English Sporting director for Rochester New York FC and former professional footballer who played in the Football League as a forward for Darlington. He later played non-league football for Guisborough Town.
in 2019 Lee Tucker took charge of a new men's team at Norton & Stockton Ancients. In their 1st season the team won promotion from the Wearside League division 2.

in 2019 Lee Tucker took charge of a new men's team at Norton & Stockton Ancients. In their 1st season the team won promotion from the Wearside League division 2.

In 2021, Tucker took over as the Sporting director of Rochester New York FC following a four year hiatus.

References

1971 births
Living people
Footballers from Middlesbrough
English footballers
Association football forwards
Middlesbrough F.C. players
Darlington F.C. players
Guisborough Town F.C. players
English Football League players